April 25 - Eastern Orthodox liturgical calendar - April 27

All fixed commemorations below are observed on May 9 by Orthodox Churches on the Old Calendar.

For April 26th, Orthodox Churches on the Old Calendar commemorate the Saints listed on April 13.

Saints

 Martyrs Cyril, Chindeu, and Tasie of Axiopolis (c. 304)
 Righteous Virgin-martyr Glaphyra of Nicomedia (322)
 Hieromartyr Basil of Amasea, Bishop of Amasea (c. 323) 
 Saints Andrew and Anatolius, disciples of St. Euthymius the Great (5th century) 
 Saint Justa, nun.
 Venerable Nestor.
 Saint Leo of Samos (Leontos), Bishop of Samos, Wonderworker (9th century)

Pre-Schism Western saints

 Peter of Braga (Peter of Rates), first Bishop and martyr of Braga in Portugal (c. 60).
 Saint Marcellinus, a Pope of Rome, who may have been martyred in repentance for his previous errors (304)  (see also: June 7 - East)
 Saint Exuperantia, a saint whose relics are venerated in Troyes in France (c. 380).
 Saint Lucidius of Verona, Bishop of Verona in Italy.
 Saint Clarentius (Clarent), successor of St Etherius as Bishop of Vienne in France (c. 620)
 Saint Trudpert, a hermit, possibly from Ireland, who lived in Münstethal in Germany (c. 644) 
 Saint Richarius (Riquier), Abbot, Confessor, in Picardy (645)

Post-Schism Orthodox saints

 Venerable George of Cyprus, first Igumen of the Monastery of St. John Chrysostomos, near Koutsovendis, in the Kyrenia District of Cyprus (1091)
 Venerable Calantius of Tamassos (Kalandios), one of the "300 Allemagne Saints" in Cyprus (12th century)
 Saint Stephen of Perm, Bishop of Perm (1396)
 New Martyrs of Novo Selo ("Holy Trinity" Novoselska convent), Bulgaria (1876)

New martyrs and confessors

 New martyrs John Pankov, priest, and his children Nicholas Pankov, and Peter Pankov, new martyrs of Orlov (1918)
 Venerable Elder Ieronymos of Simonopetra (1957) (see also: May 9 - NS)

Other commemorations

 Translation of the sacred relics of Saint Ioannicius of Devic, Serbia (1430)
 Repose of Schema-nun Agnia (Chizhikov) of Akulovo (1984)
 Repose of Schema-Archimandrite Aimilianos (Vafeidis) of Simonopetra (2019)

Icon gallery

Notes

References

Sources
 April 26 / May 9. Orthodox Calendar (Pravoslavie.ru).
 May 9 / April 26. Holy Trinity Russian Orthodox Church (A parish of the Patriarchate of Moscow).
 April 26. OCA - The Lives of the Saints.
 The Autonomous Orthodox Metropolia of Western Europe and the Americas (ROCOR). St. Hilarion Calendar of Saints for the year of our Lord 2004. St. Hilarion Press (Austin, TX). p. 31.
 April 26. Latin Saints of the Orthodox Patriarchate of Rome.
 The Roman Martyrology. Transl. by the Archbishop of Baltimore. Last Edition, According to the Copy Printed at Rome in 1914. Revised Edition, with the Imprimatur of His Eminence Cardinal Gibbons. Baltimore: John Murphy Company, 1916. p. 117.
 Rev. Richard Stanton. A Menology of England and Wales, or, Brief Memorials of the Ancient British and English Saints Arranged According to the Calendar, Together with the Martyrs of the 16th and 17th Centuries. London: Burns & Oates, 1892. pp. 182–183.
Greek Sources
 Great Synaxaristes:  26 Απριλίου. Μέγας Συναξαριστής.
  Συναξαριστής. 26 Απριλίου. Ecclesia.gr. (H Εκκλησία της Ελλάδος). 
Russian Sources
  9 мая (26 апреля). Православная Энциклопедия под редакцией Патриарха Московского и всея Руси Кирилла (электронная версия). (Orthodox Encyclopedia - Pravenc.ru).
  26 апреля (ст.ст.) 9 мая 2013 (нов. ст.) . Русская Православная Церковь Отдел внешних церковных связей. (DECR).

April in the Eastern Orthodox calendar